The Barnacle Cordious is the second full-length album by the American experimental metal band Paria.  It was released by Black Market Activities on March 17, 2009.

Track listing

Reception

References

2009 albums
Black Market Activities albums
Paria (band) albums